Elena Gigli (born 9 July 1985 in Empoli) is a female water polo goalkeeper from Italy, who won the gold medal with the Women's National Team at the 2004 Summer Olympics in Athens, Greece. She was the top goalkeeper at the 2012 Olympics, with 56 saves. She also won silver medal in European championship in Belgrado in 2006.  Her club team is Fiorentina Waterpolo Giotti (Italy) and she won the Len Champions Cup and Italian league in 2006/2007.

See also
 Italy women's Olympic water polo team records and statistics
 List of Olympic champions in women's water polo
 List of Olympic medalists in water polo (women)
 List of players who have appeared in multiple women's Olympic water polo tournaments
 List of women's Olympic water polo tournament goalkeepers

References

External links
 
 

1985 births
Living people
Italian female water polo players
Water polo goalkeepers
Water polo players at the 2004 Summer Olympics
Water polo players at the 2008 Summer Olympics
Water polo players at the 2012 Summer Olympics
Medalists at the 2004 Summer Olympics
Olympic gold medalists for Italy in water polo
People from Empoli
Sportspeople from the Metropolitan City of Florence
21st-century Italian women